The Agorà Ice Stadium is the largest ice arena in Milan, Italy. Prior to its opening in 1987, Milan had had only one ice rink. It is currently the home of the Hockey Milano Rossoblu ice hockey team, as well as around 300 athletes in the disciplines of figure skating, speed skating, and synchronized skating.

The Agorà has a seating capacity of 4,000 and receives 150,000 to 200,000 visitors annually. It can host both national and international events. Its facilities include a standard track of 30 x 60 metres and a restaurant/bar.

The Agorà hosted the 2013 World Junior Figure Skating Championships.

External links
 http://www.stadioghiaccio.it/ - Official Web Site

Indoor arenas in Italy
Indoor ice hockey venues in Italy
Sports venues in Milan